This is a list of members of the Western Australian Legislative Council from 22 May 1958 to 21 May 1960. The chamber had 30 seats made up of ten provinces each electing three members, on a system of rotation whereby one-third of the members would retire at each biennial election.

The Constitution Acts Amendment Act (No.2) 1963 (No.72 of 1963) affected all terms concluding after 1962, as well as the provinces which members represented.

Notes
 On 1 November 1958, West Province Labor MLC Gilbert Fraser died. Labor candidate Ron Thompson won the resulting by-election on 7 February 1959.

Sources
 
 
 

Members of Western Australian parliaments by term